The women's team sprint competition at the 2019  UEC European Track Championships, in the Netherlands was held on 16 October 2019.

Results

Qualifying
All teams advanced to the first round.

First round
First round heats were held as follows:
Heat 1: 4th v 5th fastest
Heat 2: 3rd v 6th fastest
Heat 3: 2nd v 7th fastest
Heat 4: 1st v 8th fastest

The heat winners were ranked on time, from which the top 2 proceeded to the gold medal final and the other 2 proceeded to the bronze medal final.

Finals

References

Women's team sprint
European Track Championships – Women's team sprint